Citadel is the third studio album by American progressive rock band Starcastle. It is the second of two Starcastle albums to be produced by Roy Thomas Baker, who produced many of Queen's albums. Unlike their first two albums, Citadel features shorter, more concise compositions from the band. This trend would further continue in Starcastle's next album, Real to Reel.

Track listing 
All songs written by Starcastle.

Side 1
 "Shine On Brightly" - 5:14
 "Shadows of Song" - 5:08
 "Can't Think Twice" - 3:51
 "Wings of White" - 4:48

Side 2
 "Evening Wind" - 5:27
 "Change in Time" - 4:31
 "Could This Be Love?" - 3:23
 "Why Have They Gone?" - 6:53

Personnel

Band
Terry Luttrell - lead vocals
Matthew Stewart - backing vocals, electric guitar, mandolin
Stephen Hagler - backing vocals, electric guitar
Gary Strater - backing vocals, bass guitar, Moog Taurus
Herb Schildt - piano, synthesizer, organ, Mellotron, Oberheim OB-X
Stephen Tassler - backing vocals, drums, percussion

References 

1977 albums
Starcastle albums
Albums produced by Roy Thomas Baker
Epic Records albums